Shah Tut may refer to:
 Shah Tut, Razavi Khorasan
 Shah Tut, South Khorasan